Matthew Robert Scurfield (born March 10, 1976 in Sarnia, Ontario) is a Canadian-born American musician and songwriter from Massachusetts. He is a drummer and a notable figure in the progressive rock scene. His professional work includes studio work, touring and live performances. Matt Scurfield has recorded and/or toured with Jaye Foucher, Joe Stump, Event, Matahari, Gus G, Lita Ford, Gary Hoey, Chad Hollister Band, and Sonic Joyride 

Scurfield graduated in 1998, with a degree in Professional Music, from Berklee College of Music. Scurfield's drumming style, influenced by the likes of Queensrÿche and Iron Maiden, embraces linear drumming, double bass styles, and masterfully employs basic techniques developed through three years of Drum Corps. In between touring and studio projects Matt is a private instructor at Centre Street Drums in Taunton, Massachusetts.

Discography 
 Nocturnal Symphony by Firewind (1998)
 Electric Skies by Event (1999)
 Behemoth by Sonic Joyride (2000)
 Contagious Grooves by Jaye Foucher (2000)
 Sacred Ground by The Reign of Terror (2001)
 2001: A Shred Odyssey by Joe Stump (2001)
 Human Condition by Event (2001)
 Conquer and Divide by Joe Stump's Reign of Terror (2002)
 Scratching at the Surface by Event (2003)
 Shredology/Midwest Shredfest by Joe Stump (2005)
 Shrine of Counterfeits by Matahari (2005)
 American Made by Gary Hoey (2006)
 Utopia by Gary Hoey (2010)
 Living Like A Runaway by Lita Ford (2012)
 Deja Blues by Gary Hoey (2013)
 Dust & Bones by Gary Hoey (2016)
 Neon Highway Blues by Gary Hoey (2019)
 Light of Truth by Event (2021)

References

External links
http://www.garyhoey.com
https://web.archive.org/web/20080828121353/http://www.jayefoucher.com/about/band.html
[ Allmusic.com]

1976 births
American rock drummers
Living people
Musicians from Ontario
People from Sarnia
20th-century American drummers
American male drummers
21st-century American drummers
20th-century American male musicians
21st-century American male musicians